Fleur Lewis (3 December 2003) is a British champion and British international swimmer.

Biography
Lewis, at age 10 transferred to the competitive programme at the Barnet Copthall SC. She was educated at Ellesmere College and competed for Great Britain at the 2019 European Junior Championships.

At the 2022 British Swimming Championships Lewis won the 1500 metres event, to claim her first senior national title. She also claimed a silver medal in the 800 metres.

References

2003 births
Living people
English female swimmers
British female swimmers